A mood stabilizer is a psychiatric medication used to treat mood disorders characterized by intense and sustained mood shifts, such as bipolar disorder and the bipolar type of schizoaffective disorder.

Uses
Mood stabilizers are best known for the treatment of bipolar disorder, preventing mood shifts to mania (or hypomania) and depression. Mood stabilizers are also used in schizoaffective disorder when it is the bipolar type.

Examples
The term "mood stabilizer" does not describe a mechanism, but rather an effect. More precise terminology based on pharmacology is used to further classify these agents. Drugs commonly classed as mood stabilizers include:

Mineral
 Lithium – Lithium is the "classic" mood stabilizer, the first to be approved by the US FDA, and still popular in treatment. Therapeutic drug monitoring is required to ensure lithium levels remain in the therapeutic range: 0.6 or 0.8-1.2 mEq/L (or millimolar). Signs and symptoms of toxicity include nausea, vomiting, diarrhea, and ataxia. The most common side effects are lethargy and weight gain. The less common side effects of using lithium are blurred vision, a slight tremble in the hands, and a feeling of being mildly ill. In general, these side effects occur in the first few weeks after commencing lithium treatment. These symptoms can often be improved by lowering the dose.

Anticonvulsants
Many agents described as "mood stabilizers" are also categorized as anticonvulsants. The term "anticonvulsant mood stabilizers" is sometimes used to describe these as a class. Although this group is also defined by effect rather than mechanism, there is at least a preliminary understanding of the mechanism of most of the anticonvulsants used in the treatment of mood disorders.

 Valproate – Available in extended release form. This drug can be very irritating to the stomach, especially when taken as a free acid. Liver function and CBC should be monitored.
 Lamotrigine (aka Lamictal) – FDA approved for bipolar disorder maintenance therapy, not for acute mood problems like depression or mania/hypomania. The usual target dose is 100–200 mg daily, titrated to by 25 mg increments every 2 weeks. Lamotrigine can cause Stevens–Johnson syndrome, a very rare but potentially fatal skin condition.
 Carbamazepine – FDA approved for the treatment of acute manic or mixed (i.e., both depressed and manic mood features) episodes in people with bipolar disorder type I. Carbamazepine can rarely cause a dangerous decrease in neutrophils, a type of white blood cell, called agranulocytosis. It interacts with many medications, including other mood stabilizers (e.g. lamotrigine) and antipsychotics (e.g. quetiapine).

There is insufficient evidence to support the use of various other anticonvulsants, such as gabapentin and topiramate, as mood stabilizers.

Antipsychotics
 Some atypical antipsychotics (aripiprazole, asenapine, cariprazine, lurasidone, olanzapine, paliperidone, quetiapine, risperidone, and ziprasidone) also have mood stabilizing effects and are thus commonly prescribed even when psychotic symptoms are absent.

Other
 It is also conjectured that omega-3 fatty acids may have a mood stabilizing effect. Compared with placebo, omega-3 fatty acids appear better able to augment known mood stabilizers in reducing depressive (but perhaps not manic) symptoms of bipolar disorder; additional trials would be needed to establish the effects of omega-3 fatty acids alone.
 It is known that even subclinical hypothyroidism can blunt a patient's response to both mood stabilizers and antidepressants. Furthermore, preliminary research into the use of thyroid augmentation in patients with refractory and rapid-cycling bipolar disorder has been positive, showing a slowing in cycle frequency and reduction in symptoms. Most studies have been conducted on an open-label basis. One large, controlled study of 300 mcg daily dose of levothyroxine (T4) found it superior to placebo for this purpose. In general, studies have shown T4 to be well tolerated and to show efficacy even in patients without overt hypothyroidism.

Combination therapy
In routine practice, monotherapy is often not sufficiently effective for acute and/or maintenance therapy and thus most patients are given combination therapies. Combination therapy (atypical antipsychotic with lithium or valproate) shows better efficacy over monotherapy in the manic phase in terms of efficacy and prevention of relapse. However, side effects are more frequent and discontinuation rates due to adverse events are higher with combination therapy than with monotherapy.

Relationship to antidepressants
Most mood stabilizers are primarily antimanic agents, meaning that they are effective at treating mania and mood cycling and shifting, but are not effective at treating acute depression. The principal exceptions to that rule, because they treat both manic and depressive symptoms, are lamotrigine, lithium carbonate, olanzapine and quetiapine.

Nevertheless, antidepressants are still often prescribed in addition to mood stabilizers during depressive phases. This brings some risks, however, as antidepressants can induce mania, psychosis, and other disturbing problems in people with bipolar disorder—in particular, when taken alone. The risk of antidepressant-induced mania when given to patients concomitantly on antimanic agents is not known for certain but may still exist. The majority of antidepressants appear ineffective in treating bipolar depression.

Antidepressants cause several risks when given to bipolar patients. They are ineffective in treating acute bipolar depression, preventing relapse, and can cause rapid cycling. Studies have shown that antidepressants have no benefit versus a placebo or other treatment. Antidepressants can also lead to a higher rate of non-lethal suicidal behavior. Relapse can also be related to treatment with antidepressants. This is less likely to occur if a mood stabilizer is combined with an antidepressant, rather than an antidepressant being used alone.  Evidence from previous studies shows that rapid cycling is linked to use of antidepressants. Rapid cycling is defined as the presence of four or more mood episodes within a year's time. Evidence suggests that rapid cycling and mixed symptoms have become more common since antidepressant medication has come into widespread use.  There is a need for caution when treating bipolar patients with antidepressant medication due to the risks that they pose.

Pharmacodynamics
The precise mechanism of action of lithium is still unknown, and it is suspected that it acts at various points of the neuron between the nucleus and the synapse. Lithium is known to inhibit the enzyme GSK-3B. This improves the functioning of the circadian clock—which is thought to be often malfunctioning in people with bipolar disorder—and positively modulates gene transcription of brain-derived neurotrophic factor (BDNF). The resulting increase in neural plasticity may be central to lithium's therapeutic effects. How lithium works in the human body is not completely understood, but its benefits are most likely related to its effects on electrolytes such as potassium, sodium, calcium and magnesium.

All of the anticonvulsants routinely used to treat bipolar disorder are blockers of voltage-gated sodium channels, affecting the brain's glutamate system. For valproic acid, carbamazepine and oxcarbazepine, however, their mood-stabilizing effects may be more related to effects on the GABAergic system. Lamotrigine is known to decrease the patient's cortisol response to stress.

One possible downstream target of several mood stabilizers such as lithium, valproate, and carbamazepine is the arachidonic acid cascade.

See also
 Treatment of bipolar disorder

Categories

References

External links

 
Drug classes defined by psychological effects